The Arrowhead Library System (ALS) is a library system consisting of seven public libraries and several academic/school library affiliate members, all serving Rock County, Wisconsin. The headquarters of the library system is located on the lower level of the Milton Public Library in Milton, Wisconsin.

History
The library system was founded in 1974 to coordinate services among the libraries in Rock County. This collaboration allowed for the expansion of library services to the residents of the county, including interlibrary loan, a book delivery system, and public relations activities.

In 2017 the Arrowhead Library System agreed to join the SHARE consortium, which links Arrowhead to other library systems in southern Wisconsin. This allows for the replacement of the cataloging software used by the ALS, increasing the number of books in the catalog from 750,000 to over 2.15 million; provides for user access to a greater number of library items; and provides a greater range of digital features for library patrons.

Public Libraries
 Beloit Public Library
 Clinton Public Library
 Eager Free Public Library, Evansville
 Edgerton Public Library
 Hedberg Public Library, Janesville (Two Branches: Main Branch and Express Branch) 
 Milton Public Library
 Orfordville Public Library

References

External links
Arrowhead Library System homepage

Public libraries in Wisconsin
Education in Rock County, Wisconsin
County library systems in Wisconsin